Pierre Kőszáli (born 11 January 1971) is a Hungarian alpine skier. He competed in four events at the 1992 Winter Olympics.

References

1971 births
Living people
Hungarian male alpine skiers
Olympic alpine skiers of Hungary
Alpine skiers at the 1992 Winter Olympics
Sportspeople from Lausanne